Yongkang East railway station is a freight railway station on the Jinhua–Taizhou railway in Yongkang, Jinhua, Zhejiang, China.

History
The station opened in 2021, replacing the freight facilities at Yongkang railway station, which was closed on 16 June 2021 when the Jinhua–Wenzhou railway was rerouted.

References

Railway stations in Zhejiang
Railway stations in China opened in 2021
Yongkang, Zhejiang
Buildings and structures in Jinhua